Teodosii Tyt Halushchynskyi, O.S.B.M.(sometimes Theodosiy Halushchinski; ; 13 April 1880 – 31 August 1952) was a Ukrainian Basilian priest, biblical scholar and church historian.

Biography 
After studying philosophy and theology at Lviv University and the universities of Fribourg, Vienna (D Th, 1906), and Innsbruck, he taught at the Stanyslaviv Theological Seminary. He took monastic vows in 1908 and was appointed lecturer at Lviv University (1915) and at the Greek Catholic Theological Seminary in Lviv (1920), where he also served as rector (1920–5). He was a founding member and president (1923–6) of the Ukrainian Theological Scholarly Society. In 1931 he became the spiritual adviser at Saint Josaphat's Ukrainian Pontifical College in Rome. In 1949 he was elected archimandrite of the Basilian monastic order and appointed consultator to the Congregation for the Oriental Churches.

Writings
Besides numerous articles on public affairs, philosophy, and theology, Halushchynsky wrote Istoriia bibliina Staroho Zavita (Biblical History of the Old Testament, 3 vols, 1914–34) and De urbis Babel exordiis ac de primo in terra Sinear regno (1917), and edited Acta Innocentii pp. III (1198–1216) A Registris Vaticanis (1944).

External links

 Halushchynsky, Tyt Teodosii at Encyclopedia of Ukraine

1880 births
1952 deaths
People from Buchach
People from the Kingdom of Galicia and Lodomeria
Ukrainian Austro-Hungarians
Ukrainian Eastern Catholics
Order of Saint Basil the Great
University of Fribourg alumni
University of Vienna alumni
University of Innsbruck alumni